Diptilon aterea is a moth of the subfamily Arctiinae. It was described by William Schaus in 1901. It is found in Brazil and Paraguay.

The wingspan is about 26 mm. The forewings are hyaline (glass like) with black veins and margins and some orange at the base. The hindwings are orange yellow with a black terminal band.

References

Euchromiina
Moths described in 1901